Martin Tauber (born 4 November 1976) is an Austrian cross-country skier. He competed in the men's 15 kilometre classical event at the 2006 Winter Olympics.

Doping scandal in Turin 
In April 2007 Tauber was banned by the International Olympic Committee (IOC) from competing in any Olympic Games for live for his involvement in a doping at the 2006 Winter Olympics in Turin.

References

External links
 

1976 births
Living people
Austrian male cross-country skiers
Olympic cross-country skiers of Austria
Cross-country skiers at the 2006 Winter Olympics
Austrian sportspeople in doping cases
Doping cases in cross-country skiing
Sportspeople from Innsbruck